Hüyükköy is a village in the Baskil District of Elazığ Province in Turkey. The village is populated by Turks and had a population of 52 in 2021.

References

Villages in Baskil District